Du Tiehuan (born August 1938) is a general (shangjiang) of the People's Liberation Army (PLA). He was a member of the 15th Central Committee of the Chinese Communist Party and a delegate to the 9th National People's Congress.

Biography
Du was born in Anshan, Liaoning, Manchukuo in August 1938. 

He enlisted in the People's Liberation Army (PLA) in August 1955, and joined the Chinese Communist Party (CCP) in September 1959. In 1979, he participated in the Sino-Vietnamese War. In 1984, he served in the 46th Group Army for a short while before being assigned to the 67th Group Army as deputy political commissioner in 1985, and he rose to become political commissioner in 1988. He was assistant head of the People's Liberation Army General Political Department in November 1992, and one year later was promoted to deputy head. In December 1994, he was appointed political commissioner of the Jinan Military Region, he remained in that position until November 1996, when he was transferred to the Beijing Military Region and appointed political commissioner.

He was promoted to the rank of major general (shaojiang) in 1988, lieutenant general (zhongjiang) in 1993 and general (shangjiang) in 2000.

References

1938 births
Living people
People from Anshan
People's Liberation Army generals from Liaoning
People's Republic of China politicians from Liaoning
Chinese Communist Party politicians from Liaoning
Delegates to the 9th National People's Congress
Members of the 15th Central Committee of the Chinese Communist Party